This is a list of Spanish football transfers for the winter sale in the 2015–16 season of La Liga and Segunda División. Only moves from La Liga and Segunda División are listed.

The winter transfer window will open on 4 January 2016, although a few transfers took place prior to that date. The window closed at midnight on 31 January 2016. Players without a club can join one at any time, either during or in between transfer windows. Clubs below La Liga level can also sign players on loan at any time. If need be, clubs can sign a goalkeeper on an emergency loan, if all others are unavailable.

Winter 2015-16 transfer window

References

Transfers
Spain
2015–16